Cinécraft Productions, Inc. is a privately held American corporate film and video production studio in Cleveland, Ohio. It was one of the hundreds of production houses in the United States that specialized in sponsored films during the mid-20th century. In Cleveland alone, there were at least 13 sponsored film studios at the height of the area's film production era. Cinécraft was an important innovator in the early history of television. The studio is said to be the longest-standing corporate film and video production house in the U.S.

History and innovations

Cinécraft was founded by Ray and Betty Culley in 1939. Promoting "Sound Business Pictures in Natural Color," the studio began in rental space in the Card Building on St. Clair Ave. in downtown Cleveland. In 1947, the studio moved to 2515 Franklin Blvd. in Ohio City, Cleveland.

Cinécraft was a pioneer in the use of teleprompters and filming using a multi-camera setup. Using two or more cameras with teleprompters to simultaneously film the same scene from different angles cut production costs tremendously. The studio used the technique when it produced The Ohio Story, a TV-series that it filmed and ran from 1953 to 1961 for the Ohio Bell Telephone Company. The Ohio Story was based on the Frank Siedel-created radio series that ran from 1947 to 1953. In 1954, the format switched to two radio episodes and one television show per week. The radio series ended in 1955 after over 1,300 radio episodes had been produced. Premiering on October 4, 1953, The Ohio Story TV-series lasted nine years, with 175 TV episodes being produced.

Cinécraft was the first to film a TV infomercial. It featured William Grover "Papa" Barnard selling Vitamix blenders. The studio assembled many early productions featuring Cleveland-based Louise Winslow, a pioneer in television programming focused on sewing, cooking, and crafts. A pioneering, five-part series was created for The Austin Company in 1948.  It explained how live television was produced and broadcast.

The Cleveland Play House was a source for many actors used in Cinécraft films, and the Cleveland Symphony Orchestra provided elaborate music scores for the company. Occasionally, they recruited Hollywood actors to appear in their movies at their client's request. Popular personalities that appeared in Cinécraft productions included Danny Kaye, Tim Conway, Ernie Anderson, Joel Grey, Chet Huntley, and Basil Rathbone.

Core transitions
In 1970, Paul Culley bought the company from his older brother Ray Culley, the original founder.  Paul led the transition from film to video in the 1970s. For over 50 years, a member of the Culley family had run the studio, and many Culley family members worked there. Then, in 1985, Neil McCormick, a Cinécraft employee, and his wife, Maria Keckan, a video producer, bought the studio. Together they completed the change from film to broadcast-quality video as industrial and commercial clients demanded faster and easier ways to make effective motion pictures.  In the 1990s, the studio embraced digital technology with interactive computer-based medical training programs. This early period of digital technology was improved upon through the years as Cinécraft Productions became known for e-learning and producing national and international projects for Fortune 1000 companies.

21st century developments
In 2018, Dan Keckan was named Chief Executive Officer, and Matt Walsh was named Chief Operating Officer.

The Hagley Museum and Library acquired the Cinécraft film archives in 2021 and initiated a ten-year project to digitize the films, scripts, and records in order to make them available on the Hagley Library website. 

In 2023 the studio was still operating out of the John Eisenmann-designed building that had started as the home of the West Side Branch of the Cleveland Public Library in 1898.

Clients
Cinécraft's major film client's included DuPont, Hercules Inc., Standard Oil of Ohio, Seiberling Rubber Company, Firestone Tire and Rubber, Goodyear Tire and Rubber, Bethlehem Steel, Owens-Corning, Ohio Bell, General Electric, Westinghouse Electric Corporation, American Greetings, Carling Brewing, and Republic Steel. Most of the studio's film business came through advertising agencies, including Fuller & Smith & Ross, Inc. and McCann-Erickson

Notable Cinécraft sponsored films
 The Romance of Iron and Steel (1938) – ARMCO. The sequences on how steel is made are beautifully choreographed given the film equipment of the time.
 It Happened in the Kitchen (1941) - General Electric. Focuses on the importance of having a "modern kitchen" and how modernizing can benefit the average American family.
 Linter Logic (1945) – Hercules Powder Company. Importance of linters (a by-product from cotton oil production) in the burgeoning synthetics industry.
 Crystal Clear (1946) - Fostoria Glass Co. Follows the process of making glass from shoveling batch into ovens, to gathering, blowing, annealing, and inspections. The film targets brides-to-be and was a popular film to play in home economics classes.
 Naturally, It's FM (1947) - General Electric. The film helped launch the GE Musiphonic high-end record player, radio, shortwave, and AM and FM console all in one unit.
 Freedom's Proving Grounds (1953) - Standard Oil of Ohio (SOHIO). W. Ward Marsh, the Cleveland Plain Dealer film critic for 50 years, says the film may very well be the best picture SOHIO has sponsored.
 A Fan Family Album (1954) - Westinghouse. A sales training film made in an era before air conditioning when fans were extremely important. An Industrial musical
 Milestones of Motoring (1954) - Standard Oil of Ohio. Industrial musical. Traces the evolution of automotive innovations starting with Alexander Winton making the first automobile sale in 1898, the Stanley Motor Carriage Company and steam-powered cars, all the way to 1954 when the film was made. Stars Joe E. Brown and Merv Griffin.
 The Long Ships Passing (1960) - Lake Carriers Association. Traces the history and unique features of the 700-foot-long and longer ships that carry bulk on the upper Great Lakes.
 The Velvet Curtain (1962) - The American Good Government Society. Hollywood actor, Reed Hadley, in the role of a journalist discussing voting and voter turnout.
 Invitation to Ohio (1964) – Ohio Bell Telephone. A peanut vendor gets mistaken for a high-powered CEO and is given a tour of Ohio. Stars Wally Cox and John Dehner.
 Why Politics? (1966) – Republic Steel. The first in a series of Republic Steel middle management training films. Stars Richard Nixon; Hagley Digital Archive
 C-5 Galaxy: World's Largest Aircraft (1967) -  U.S. Airforce. Tells the story of the building of the Lockheed Corporation C-5 Galaxy airplane - at the time, the world's largest aircraft.
 The Spoilers (1970) - Supermarket Institute. The film shows how unhealthy food preparation can make you sick. One of the most duplicated sponsored films ever.
 Projection '70: Communications (1970) – Standard Oil of Ohio. One of a series of Projection '70 films made to help commemorate SOHIO's 100th anniversary.
 Where's Joe? (1972) – United Steelworkers of America and a consortium of leading U.S. steel corporations. The movie is credited with helping put the first "no-strike" clause into a labor contract in the history of the U.S. steel industry.
 Free Wheelin (1976) – B. F. Goodrich. A film about the custom van craze of the 1970s.
 Where the River Enters the Sea (1982) – Standard Oil of Ohio. Shot on location in a remote Alaskan village. One of the studio's last film projects.

Notable Cinécraft made for television films
 Television Televised (1948) - The Austin Company. Series explains how the new technology of television works
 Food Is Fun (1950) – American Gas Association. Starring Louise Winslow, the "Martha Stewart " of early television
 Healthy Living Is Fun (1950) – Natural Foods Institute (VitaMix). One of the first infomercials
 Ohio Story 10th Anniversary (1957) – Ohio Bell Telephone. One of a series of 175 Ohio Story TV episodes written by Frank Siedel and starring Nelson Olmsted

External links 
 Cinécraft Production Films: Hagley Library Digital Archive
 Online Field Guide to Sponsored Films: National Film Preservation Foundation
 Flashback Friday: Cinécraft history blog
 Cinécraft film collection: Moving Image Archive News
 Jim Dubelko, Cinecraft Productions: The Historic Film Company produced by a Love Story

References 

Companies based in Cleveland
1939 establishments in Ohio
American documentary film producers
American companies established in 1939
Film production companies of the United States
1950s in American television
1960s in American television